Carll House is a historic home located on the northwest corner of Wall Street and Central Street in Huntington in Suffolk County, New York. It consists of a -story, three-bay, shingled main residence with a 2-story, three-bay shingled west wing.  The earliest section of the house was built about 1820 and the west wing added about 1840.

It was added to the National Register of Historic Places in 1985.

References

Houses on the National Register of Historic Places in New York (state)
Houses completed in 1820
Houses in Suffolk County, New York
National Register of Historic Places in Suffolk County, New York